Another Believer may refer to:
 "Another Believer", a song by Rufus Wainwright from the soundtrack to the film Meet the Robinsons
 Jason Moore (Wikipedia editor) (born 1984/1985), American Wikipedia editor with the username "Another Believer"